The Alberta School of Business, University of Alberta is located in Edmonton, Alberta, Canada. Founded in 1916, it is a research-intensive publicly funded institution and is consistently ranked in the top 50 publicly funded universities for research by the Financial Times of London.

The Alberta School of Business was the first business school in Canada to be accredited by the Association to Advance Collegiate Schools of Business (AACSB) in 1968 and maintained its accreditation in 2012 making it the longest accredited business school in Canada.

Recognized for its leadership in research, the quality of academic programming, graduate career success, and economic impact for Alberta and the world, the Alberta School of Business fosters and supports an environment where innovation and entrepreneurial thinking is free to flourish.

Overview

Dr. Joseph Doucet (Stanley A. Milner Chair in Leadership) was appointed Dean July 1, 2013, succeeding Dr. Mike Percy who was Dean of the Alberta School of Business from 1997 to 2011. The School is also supported by a Business Advisory Council, which serves as a vital communications link between the School, the university and the business community.

The Alberta School of Business is divided into four award-winning teaching and research departments: Accounting, Operations & Information Systems; Finance and Statistical Analysis; Strategic Management and Organization, which includes the study of family business; and Marketing, Business Economics & Law which also houses the specialty areas of energy economics, retailing, real estate  and international business.

The Alberta School of Business has a strong culture of engagement with the community. Rigorous research is supported by 10 relevant applied research centres with close industry linkages. The School's signature community event is the Canadian Business Leader Award (CBLA); each year since 1982, the Alberta School of Business and its Business Advisory Council (BAC) have presented the Canadian Business Leader Award (CBLA) to a Canadian of distinction.

Academics

Profile

The School has 2,071 undergraduate, 757 full and part-time MBA, and 54 doctoral students, as well as alumni of more than 30,000 throughout the world, who belong to a Business Alumni Association with national and international chapters and events. The School also houses over 27 student clubs.

Programs

The Alberta School of Business offers undergraduate, master's and PhD business degrees as well as select professional development and executive programs.

Bachelor of Commerce - The innovative BCom program at the Alberta School of Business has empowered thousands of undergrads to shape their futures and become leaders in Alberta and around the world. There are five different BCom degree programs and 16 majors. The Bachelor of Commerce program offers and majors in Accounting, Business Economics and Law, Business Studies, Decision and Information Systems, Distribution Management, East Asian Studies, Entrepreneurship and Small Business, European Studies, Finance, Human Resource Management, International Business, Latin American Studies, Management Information Systems, Management and Organization, Marketing, Operations Management, as well as Retailing and Services.

MBA & Master's Programs - Bringing together world-class faculty with the best and brightest students from around the globe, the Alberta School of Business master's programs equip students with the skills and knowledge to advance their careers. Programs include the MBA, Executive MBA, Master of Accounting and Master of Financial Management. The UAlberta MBA program offers career track specializations in Energy Finance, Innovation & Entrepreneurship, Operations & Business Analytics, Public Sector & Healthcare Management, and Strategy & Consulting. Select professional development and executive programs are also offered through the Master's Programs Office.

PhD - The Doctor of Philosophy in Business program offers meaningful research in five specializations of business education, generous scholarships, teaching opportunities, and a chance to work with world-renowned mentors in a research-intensive business school.

History
The Alberta School of Business, University of Alberta was founded in 1916, when a School of Accountancy was created at the University. The first Bachelor of Commerce degrees were granted in 1924 and in 1928, a School of Commerce was formally established. In 1960, after implementing significant revisions to its curriculum, the School became a full-fledged Faculty of the University of Alberta, and in 1968, the Faculty of Business Administration and Commerce became the first business school in Canada to be granted accreditation by the Association to Advance Collegiate Schools of Business. In 1984, the Faculty was renamed as the Faculty of Business and moved into a new building on the University of Alberta campus.

In 2010, following the completion of the “Preservation of the Name” campaign, the name of the School was formally changed to Alberta School of Business.

The book A Chronicle of Commerce: A History of the School of Business  was written by Dr. Bill Preshing and published in 2008.

"Preserving 'Alberta' as the School's name might seem contrary to some in a world where business schools are aligning themselves with individuals' names for an established price. We have tremendous brand equity in our current moniker and, true to the spirit of this great province, the name Alberta is more substantial and more recognizable than any one person's name could represent alone." ~ Stanley A. Milner, Honorary Chairman, Preservation of the Name Campaign, 2010

References

Business schools in Canada
Business School
Educational institutions established in 1916
1916 establishments in Canada
Accounting schools in Canada